Severní is a village and administrative part of Lobendava in the Ústí nad Labem Region of the Czech Republic.

Geography
Severní is located in the Šluknov Hook region and is the northernmost village of the Czech Republic. Its name literally means "Northern". A two-tonne stone was unveiled in 2013 marking the most northerly point of the Czech Republic, although it is a metre south of the border.

References

Geography of the Ústí nad Labem Region
Villages in Děčín District